Mordellistena fallaciosa is a beetle in the genus Mordellistena of the family Mordellidae. It was described in 1970 by Ermisch.

References

fallaciosa
Beetles described in 1970